Johnny Townsend (born February 14, 1995) is an American football punter for the Orlando Guardians of the XFL. He played college football at Florida. He was drafted by the Oakland Raiders in the fifth round of the 2018 NFL Draft. His younger brother Tommy is a punter on the Chiefs' active roster.

Early years
Townsend played at William R. Boone High School in Orlando. He was initially recruited by Ohio State.

College career
Townsend had the highest NCAA Division I FBS punting average in the country in 2016, with a 47.9 yard average. With this average, he also set the all-time punting record for the Florida Gators. Townsend held the NCAA Division I FBS record for highest career average yards per punt until 2021, when it was broken by Colorado State punter Ryan Stonehouse.

Professional career

Oakland Raiders
Townsend was drafted by the Oakland Raiders in the fifth round (173rd overall) of the 2018 NFL Draft. The pick used to draft him was acquired from the Dallas Cowboys in exchange for Jamize Olawale. He made his NFL debut in the Raiders' season opener against the Los Angeles Rams. He had four punts for 178 net yards in the 33–13 loss. In Week 10, against the Los Angeles Chargers, he executed a 42-yard rush on a fake punt. He totaled 70 punts for 3,022 net yards for a 43.17 average in his rookie season. He was waived by the Raiders on August 13, 2019.

New York Giants
On August 14, 2019, Townsend was claimed off waivers by the New York Giants. He was waived on August 31, 2019.

Baltimore Ravens 
After sitting out the 2019 NFL season, Townsend had a tryouts with the Baltimore Ravens on August 18 and 22, 2020. He signed with the team on August 25, 2020. He was waived on September 5, 2020.

Kansas City Chiefs
Townsend was signed to the Kansas City Chiefs' practice squad on November 17, 2020, joining his brother Tommy who is on their active roster.

Baltimore Ravens (second stint) 
Townsend was signed by the Baltimore Ravens off the Chiefs' practice squad on December 31, 2020, after punter Sam Koch was placed on the reserve/COVID-19 list.

On August 17, 2021, Townsend was waived by the Ravens and re-signed to the practice squad on September 1, 2021 He was released from the practice squad on September 21, 2021.

Tennessee Titans
Townsend signed with the Tennessee Titans on September 30, 2021. He was waived on October 19, 2021.

Houston Texans
On October 30, 2021, Townsend was signed to the Houston Texans practice squad. On November 2, 2021, Townsend was released by the Texans.

Kansas City Chiefs (second stint)
Townsend was signed to the Kansas City Chiefs practice squad on December 23, 2021. Following his brother, Tommy, the Chiefs' usual punter, testing positive for COVID-19, he was elevated via a standard elevation for the Chiefs' week 16 game against the Pittsburgh Steelers. He reverted back to the practice squad after the game, and later released on December 28.

References

External links
Florida Gators bio

1995 births
Living people
Players of American football from Orlando, Florida
William R. Boone High School alumni
American football punters
Florida Gators football players
All-American college football players
Oakland Raiders players
New York Giants players
Baltimore Ravens players
Kansas City Chiefs players
Tennessee Titans players
Houston Texans players